This is a list of high-altitude railway stations in Europe. It includes any railway station or location with passenger railway services (on adhesion or rack railways), located at an elevation of over 2,000 metres above sea level. These are all found in the Alps in three countries: Switzerland (20), France (2) and Germany (1). At this elevation, typically above the tree line, snow becomes the main form of precipitation, therefore making railways more difficult to maintain and operate. For a list by railway line, with a lower elevation cutoff, see list of highest railways in Europe.

In the list are indicated the elevation, region, country, railway and nearest location, inhabited or not.

Main list

See also
List of busiest railway stations in Europe
Rail transport in Europe
List of highest railway stations in Switzerland

Notes

References

Railway stations
Railway stations in Europe
Lists of railway stations in Europe